Ketakee Singh is an Indian politician. She was elected to Bansdih in the 2022 Uttar Pradesh Legislative Assembly election as a member of the Bharatiya Janata Party. Ketakee Singh defeated the leader of opposition Ram Govind Chaudhary.

References

Living people
Year of birth missing (living people)
Uttar Pradesh MLAs 2022–2027
Women members of the Uttar Pradesh Legislative Assembly
Bharatiya Janata Party politicians from Uttar Pradesh
21st-century Indian women politicians